Thailand has the world's 64th largest exclusive economic zone (EEZ), with an area of .

Thailand's western sea territory stretches from the west coast of southern Thailand in the Andaman Sea and the Strait of Malacca. It shares treaty-defined maritime boundaries with Myanmar, the Andaman and Nicobar Islands of India, Indonesia and Malaysia.

Disputes
Thailand has not established agreements with Cambodia and Vietnam, who also have maritime territory in the Gulf of Thailand, leading to conflicts. It also has not established a treaty with Malaysia on their gulf waters; however, the Malaysia–Thailand joint development area was established for both countries to jointly exploit the resources in the area of their overlapping claims.

See also
 Exclusive economic zone of India
 Exclusive economic zone of Indonesia
 Exclusive economic zone of Malaysia
 Sabang strategic port development

References 

Thailand
Borders of Thailand
Economy of Thailand
Thailand–Vietnam relations